The Yale Bulldogs golf teams represent Yale University in intercollegiate competition. The men's team has won more national team championships and more individual national championships than any other university golf program in the United States. The women's team was founded in 1980 and has won a number of Ivy League championships. The teams play out of the Yale Golf Course and compete as members of the Ivy League.

History
In the fall of 1896, Yale Alumni Weekly reported that a "new game," golf, was the "rage among seniors" at the school. Students used hockey sticks and tennis balls to simulate golf clubs and golf balls on a "makeshift course" on campus. For a more "serious" game, students traveled off-campus to a complete, nine-hole course, New Haven Golf Club, that had been completed the previous year. The top Yale undergraduates at New Haven created an independent organization, Yale Golf Club, later in the fall. In November, they played their "first intercollegiate competition." It was against Columbia University. The golf team's coach during this era was Robert Pryde, a Scottish-born former cabinetmaker. The following year they won first national intercollegiate championship. Overall, during Pryde's tenure as coach Yale won another 14 NCAA championships in team golf. Pryde's 15 total victories is "a record that still stands."

By 1922, however, Yale had not won a championship in seven years. George Townsend Adee made some proposals to the Director of the Athletic Association to improve the program. One of them was to create a new golf course. Golf was becoming more popular among undergraduates but it was becoming difficult to find courses accommodate all of the new players. New Haven Country Club was not open to undergraduates. The local Race Brook Country Club was bursting at its seams so prospective players "were forced to go even further afield." In addition, Princeton University already had its own golf course and Harvard University was building one. 

In 1923, construction on a new golf course began. Three years later, in 1926, it was opened as Yale Golf Course. That year they also hired a new coach, the Scottish-born Ben Thomson. Yale won the national intercollegiate championship that year for the first time in several years. In 1927, a University Championship tournament was held. The top scorers at the tournament would have the opportunity to make the Yale golf team. The event was held in spring and had 100 participants. The top 12 players would be considered for the team. Lewis Parker was the medalist, shooting a 73, also breaking the course record. From there, the top 12 players played another qualifier; the top 8 players in this qualifier made the team. In the 1930s, Yale had much success. They won the national intercollegiate championship (now NCAA Championship) four times in the 1930s. In addition, they had much success in local events. In 1931, Yale joined the Eastern Intercollegiate Golf Association (EIGA). The conference featured a number of prominent golf schools like Princeton and Harvard. Yale won eight consecutive conference championships from the year they joined through 1938. In addition, during this era coach Thomson took the team to Scotland for regular visits.

In the 1940s, however, Yale entered a period of decline. In March 1942, as part of cost-cutting measures related to World War II, Yale fired coach Thomson. Yale won the 1942 national intercollegiate championship but would never win the event for the remainder of the decade (or ever, in fact). In June 1942, the team's captain, Arthur Williams, was drafted into World War II. Overall, the Yale team won no notable championships from 1944 to 1948.

Shortly thereafter, in the late 1940s and early 1950s, the Yale golf team began playing better. Yale won the Eastern Intercollegiate Championship in 1949, 1951, 1953, and 1954. In addition, Lincoln Roden III won the 1951 Eastern Intercollegiate individual championship. In 1955, Al Wilson became the golf coach. Wilson coached the team for 15 years. The Yale golf team had much success during this era. During Wilson's tenure, the team recorded 136 wins against 14 losses for a winning percentage of 90%. This included seven Eastern Intercollegiate Championships. During this era, Robert Trent Jones Jr. and Rees Jones, future golf course architects, participated as a player and manager, respectively, for the team.

Shortly thereafter, marked another period of decline. "The 1970s were not a good times for Yale golf," it was reported. Coach Wilson left his position in 1970. Yale undergraduates were reportedly uninterested in golf during the era. The Yale golf team "won no league championships" during the first half of the 1970s. University administration was considering selling Yale Golf Course.

In the 1970s, Scottish-born David Paterson became the golf coach. Paterson turned around the team. He arranged a national schedule where Yale would play the best schools around the nation in an effort to improve performance. Paterson also inaugurated a number of significant tournaments, including the William S. Beinecke Annual Member-Guest Tournament, Widdy Neale Invitational, Yale Men’s College-Am, Yale Fall Intercollegiate Tournament (now Macdonald Cup), F.A. Borsodi Student Championship, "Scratch Cup," and Yale Spring Opener. During this era, the future PGA Tour and European Tour pro Peter Teravainen played on the golf team. By freshman year, he was generally regarded as the best player on the team. In 1980, Paterson also inaugurated a spring break golf trip to the United Kingdom for the Yale golf team. This event would occur at four year intervals. The Yale golf team would play matches against leading British universities and golf clubs. Later on, at the end of the 20th century, the Yale golf team won the Ivy League championship in back-to-back years, in 1996 and 1997. In 2008, Paterson retired.

Women's coaching history

References

College sports teams in the United States
College sports teams in Connecticut
1896 establishments in Connecticut
Yale Bulldogs men's golf
Yale Bulldogs women's golf